The Shanti Niketan Vidhyapeeth is English medium residential cum day scholar coeducational school, located in District Meerut of Uttar Pradesh.The School was founded in 2005.It is affiliated with the Central Board of Secondary Education (CBSE), New Delhi.
Shanti Niketan Vidyapeeth is situated at Mawana road Meerut (Uttar Pradesh) . It was founded in 2005 by Nageen Charitable Trust (NCT).

References

External links

 Official website

High schools and secondary schools in Uttar Pradesh
Private schools in Uttar Pradesh
Boarding schools in Uttar Pradesh